Emerson Treacy (September 17, 1900 –  January 10, 1967) was a film, Broadway, and radio actor.

Career
Treacy was teamed with comedienne Gay Seabrook to form the double-act Treacy and Seabrook. The team was very successful on radio and in theater during the early 1930s, with routines similar to those of real husband-and-wife team Burns and Allen.

Modern audiences will remember Treacy as the flustered father of Spanky McFarland in the Our Gang short films Bedtime Worries and Wild Poses.

Treacy played in dozens of other feature films, including small roles in Adam's Rib and The Wrong Man, as well as television programs such as The Lone Ranger, Alfred Hitchcock Presents, and Perry Mason.

Death
Treacy died after undergoing surgery on January 10, 1967.

Selected filmography

 Once a Gentleman (1930) - Junior
 Girls Demand Excitement (1931) - Bobby Cruikshank (uncredited)
 Once a Hero (1931, Short)
 Sky Raiders (1931) - Jimmy Devine
 The Mouthpiece (1932) - Robert Wilson (uncredited)
 Okay America! (1932) - Jerry Robbins
 Bedtime Worries (1933, Short) - Himself, Spanky's father
 Neighbors' Wives (1933) - Jeff Lee
 Wild Poses (1933, Short) - Himself, Spanky's father
 Two Alone (1934) - Milt Pollard
 The Man Who Reclaimed His Head (1934) - French Student Pacifist (uncredited)
 Eight Bells (1935) - Sparks
 Party Wire (1935) - Martin (uncredited)
 Honeymoon Limited (1935) - Bridegroom
Champagne for Breakfast (1935) - Swifty Greer
 Dr. Socrates (1935) - Young Man (uncredited)
 Adventure in Manhattan (1936) - Injured Soldier in Play (uncredited)
 California Straight Ahead! (1937) - Charlie Porter
 Stand-In (1937) - Tommy (uncredited)
 Give Me a Sailor (1938) - Meryl (uncredited)
 Long Shot (1939) - Henry Knox
 Invitation to Happiness (1939) - Photographer (uncredited)
 They All Come Out (1939) - Larry Lee (uncredited)
 Gone with the Wind (1939) - (uncredited)
 Adam's Rib (1949) - Jules Frikke
 Key to the City (1950) - Reporter (uncredited)
 Wyoming Mail (1950) - Ben
 The Sound of Fury (1950) - Blind Preacher (uncredited)
 The Prowler (1951) - William Gilvray
 As Young as You Feel (1951) - Ernest (uncredited)
 Fort Worth (1951) - Ben Garvin
 Just This Once (1952) - Mr. Black (uncredited)
 Mutiny (1952) - Council Speaker
 Deadline – U.S.A. (1952) - City Editor (uncredited)
 A Star Is Born (1954) - Justice of the Peace (uncredited)
 Prince of Players (1955) - Protester Outside Theatre (uncredited)
 Run for Cover (1955) - Bank Clerk (uncredited)
 The Girl Can't Help It (1956) - Lawyer (uncredited)
 The Wrong Man (1956) - Mr. Wendon (uncredited)
 A Hatful of Rain (1957) - Mr. Wagner - Celia's Office Manager (uncredited)
 Sing, Boy, Sing (1958) - Doctor (uncredited)
 Handle with Care (1958) - Mr. Zollen (uncredited)
 Mardi Gras (1958) - Mr. Simmons (uncredited)
 The Sound and the Fury (1959) - Selby, Pawnshop Owner (uncredited)
 A Private's Affair (1959) - Mr. Walker (uncredited)
 All the Fine Young Cannibals (1960) - Minister (uncredited)
 High Time (1960) - Professor (uncredited)
 The Dark at the Top of the Stairs (1960) - George Williams (uncredited)
 Return to Peyton Place (1961) -  Bud Humphries (uncredited)
 The Outsider (1961) - Mr. Bassett (uncredited)
 Lover Come Back (1961) - Magnuson, Ad Council Member (uncredited)

External links

1900 births
1967 deaths
American male film actors
Place of birth missing
Burials at Forest Lawn Memorial Park (Glendale)
20th-century American male actors